Der Letzte seiner Art is the fourth album by German rapper Afrob, released in September 2009 via his own label G-Lette Music.

Track listing

Album singles

2009 albums